William R. "Bill" Ojala (January 23, 1925 – January 6, 2018) was an American politician and lawyer.

Born in Eveleth, Minnesota, Ojala served in the United States Marine Corps during World War II. He then received his bachelor's degree from University of Minnesota and his law degree from William Mitchell College of Law. He practiced law in Aurora, Minnesota. Ojala served on the school board and as county commissioner for St. Louis County, Minnesota. Ojala served in the Minnesota House of Representatives as a Democrat from 1971 to 1974. In 1974, Ojala ran for the United States House of Representatives and lost the election.

Ojala died on January 6, 2018, at the age of 92.

Notes

1925 births
2018 deaths
People from Eveleth, Minnesota
University of Minnesota alumni
William Mitchell College of Law alumni
Minnesota lawyers
County commissioners in Minnesota
Democratic Party members of the Minnesota House of Representatives
United States Marine Corps personnel of World War II
School board members in Minnesota
Candidates in the 1974 United States elections
People from Aurora, Minnesota
Military personnel from Minnesota
20th-century American lawyers